Stockwell is an administrative ward of the London Borough of Lambeth, England. It contains much of the area known as  Stockwell.

Stockwell tube station is located in the ward. At the 2011 Census the population of the ward is 14,777.

Stockwell ward is located in the Vauxhall Parliamentary constituency.

Lambeth Council elections 2018

Lambeth Council elections 2014

Lambeth Council elections 2010
At the Lambeth Council elections, 2010 residents of Stockwell ward elected three Labour Party Councillors.

References

External links
Lambeth Borough Council profile for the ward
Stockwell ward results on Lambeth website
Stand Up for Stockwell Website with news about Stockwell and the 3 local Labour councillors in Stockwell

Wards of the London Borough of Lambeth